Clitheroe Library is a Carnegie library in Clitheroe, Lancashire, England. It was opened in 1905.

History
The library was designed by the partnership of Briggs and Wolstenholme. It occupies a site at the fork of two roads and at the narrowest part features a turret with a clock and a conical roof. Historic England and the architectural historian Pevsner describe the style as "Loire" (referring to the Châteaux of the Loire Valley). Since 1976 it has been protected as a Grade II listed building.  
It still serves its original purpose as a public library. In 1990 there was a major refurbishment and the library was extended into the adjacent building, the Old Town Hall.

Gallery

See also

 Listed buildings in Clitheroe

References

Carnegie libraries in England
Library buildings completed in 1905
Public libraries in Lancashire
Clock towers in the United Kingdom
Grade II listed buildings in Lancashire
Renaissance Revival architecture in England
Clitheroe
Buildings and structures in Ribble Valley
1905 establishments in England